Big Think is a multimedia web portal founded in 2007 by Victoria Brown and Peter Hopkins. The website is a collection of interviews, presentations, and round table discussions with experts from a wide range of fields. Victoria Brown is the acting CEO and Peter Hopkins is the acting president of the company.

History 
The company was founded when Brown and Hopkins met while working with Google Video to digitize the VHS archives of The Charlie Rose Show in 2006. They began contemplating how to organize information into "short-form intellectual videos targeting online audiences" and envisioned "an online platform where the world’s leading experts could weigh in on current issues". 

In 2008 they launched with only video content. The materials involve short clips but with enough content so that they foster thinking, learning, and debate.

In 2009, they branched into blogs and written content. Their first notable blogger was Michio Kaku. Other personalities include Angelina Jolie, who joined a panel of experts in a discourse over displaced children in Iraq, and Esther Dyson who talked about the opportunities from space exploration.

In 2012, Big Think started live-streaming and providing individual and companies with "real-time interaction with notable guests". The platform also serves as a resource for educators and researchers, facilitating online learning. As of March 2012, the Big Think YouTube channel passed 20 million views, and the video archive of the website included more than 12,000 clips from 2000+ experts.

Big Think has created video series on "Courageous Collaborations", "Academic Freedom" and "Education Innovation" sponsored by the Charles Koch Foundation.

Expansion 
Big Think has since spun out other sites: Big Think Edge for Business and Floating University for Higher Education.

References

External links

American entertainment websites
Online mass media companies of the United States
Internet properties established in 2007
Education-related YouTube channels